Sufla was a Palestinian Arab village in the Jerusalem Subdistrict.  It was depopulated during the 1948 Arab–Israeli War on October 19, 1948, by the Sixth Battalion of the Harel Brigade under Operation Ha-Har. It was located 18.5 km west of Jerusalem.

History
Remains from the Crusader era have been found here.

Ottoman era
In 1838,  it was noted as a   Muslim village, es-Sifala, in the   el-Arkub   District, south west of Jerusalem.

In 1863 Victor Guérin noted a large grotto, partly filled with water. According to Guérin, Sufla was "reduced to a dozen houses."

An official Ottoman village list of about 1870 showed that safle had a total of 8 houses and a population of 18, though the population count included men only.

In 1883, the PEF's Survey of Western Palestine (SWP)  described Es Sifleh as "a small village on a narrow ridge, which falls rapidly from Beit 'Atab. On the south-east is a fine spring ('Ain Sitti Hasna) coming out of a cleft in the rocks."

British Mandate era
In the  1922 census of Palestine  conducted  by the British Mandate authorities, Sufleh  had a population of 46 inhabitants, all  Muslims,   increasing slightly in the  1931 census to  a population of 49 inhabitants, in 10 houses.

In the 1945 statistics, the village had a population of 60 Muslims, with a total of 2,061 dunams of land according to an official land and population survey. Of the land, 400 dunams were for cereals, while 3 dunams were built-up (urban) land.

A shrine was located in the village dedicated to a local sage called al-Shaykh Mu'annis.

1948 and aftermath
The village was depopulated in October, 1948, by the  Harel Brigade under Operation Ha-Har, as were the   villages of Dayr Aban,  Bayt 'Itab,  Beit Jimal, Bayt Nattif, Az-Zakariyya, and  Al-Burayj. Following the war, the area was incorporated into the State of Israel, although the land of Sufla was left undeveloped. 

In 1992, the village site was described as: "Stone rubble from houses is scattered throughout the site, which has become an open grazing area. Cave-like structures, formerly used as dwellings, also are present, and cactuses grow among the ruins and rubble. The village cemetery lies to the east of the site, and almond and olive groves cover the areas to the west and north."

References

Bibliography

External links
Welcome To Sufla
Sufla,  Zochrot
Survey of Western Palestine, Map 17:    IAA, Wikimedia commons
Sufla, from the Khalil Sakakini Cultural Center
 Sufla (Sufle)

Arab villages depopulated during the 1948 Arab–Israeli War
District of Jerusalem